The 1999 South Gloucestershire Council election took place on 6 May 1999 to elect members of South Gloucestershire unitary authority in England. All 70 seats in the council were up for election and the Liberal Democrats gained overall control of the council from no overall control.

Election result

Ward results
In wards that are represented by more than one councillor, electors were given more than one vote each, hence the voter turnout may not match the number of votes cast.

References

1999 English local elections
1999
1990s in the South Gloucestershire District